This is a list of Swedish television related events from 1968.

Events
9 March - Claes-Göran Hederström is selected to represent Sweden at the 1968 Eurovision Song Contest with his song "Det börjar verka kärlek, banne mej". He is selected to be the tenth Swedish Eurovision entry during Melodifestivalen 1968 held in Stockholm.

Debuts

Television shows

1960s
Hylands hörna (1962-1983)

Ending this year

Births

Deaths

See also
1968 in Sweden